Christ of the Ozarks statue is a monumental sculpture of Jesus located near Eureka Springs, Arkansas, atop Magnetic Mountain. It was erected in 1966 as a "Sacred Project" by  Gerald L. K. Smith.

Background
During the Great Depression, Gerald L. K. Smith served as an organizer for Huey P. Long's Share Our Wealth movement and led it briefly following Long's assassination in 1935. After many years of highly controversial, religiously charged activism that was primarily characterized by Holocaust denial, virulent racism, anti-semitism, and pro-Nazi sympathies, Smith retired to Eureka Springs, Arkansas, where he bought and renovated an old mansion. On other parts of the estate property, he planned a religious theme park, which he called "Sacred Projects". He commissioned the centerpiece, a gigantic statue of Jesus, completed in 1966. It is called Christ of the Ozarks.

He also completed a 4,100-seat amphitheater. This is the site of seasonal annual outdoor performances of The Great Passion Play, styled after the show performed in Oberammergau, Germany. It is performed four or five nights a week from the first week of May through the end of October.

Design 
The statue was primarily the work of Emmet Sullivan, who also worked on nearby Dinosaur World. He had assisted in the work at Mount Rushmore. The statue is modernistic and minimalistic; there is little facial detail or expression, and the lines and forms are generally simplified. The arms are outstretched straight, suggesting the Crucifixion; however the cross is not depicted.

It has been nicknamed "Gumby Jesus" and "Our Milk Carton with Arms" by critics.

In popular culture
The Christ of the Ozarks is featured briefly in the 2005 movie Elizabethtown and in the 1988 movie Pass the Ammo. It is also featured during the intro theme to True Detective, Season 3, which was filmed in the Ozarks region of Arkansas. It is featured in a 2018 documentary The Gospel of Eureka. The art collective Indecline hung a banner on it in July 2021 that said "God Bless Abortions"; the banner was removed.

See also
 List of statues of Jesus
 List of tallest statues
 List of the tallest statues in the United States
 Christ the Redeemer statue

References

External links
 "Christ of the Ozarks", The Great Passion Play Website 
 Sacred Projects: Christ of the Ozarks
"Reading Too Much Into ‘True Detective’: Details You May Have Missed From The Season Premiere", UpRoxx

Outdoor sculptures in Arkansas
Statues in Arkansas
Colossal statues of Jesus
Buildings and structures in Eureka Springs, Arkansas
Concrete sculptures in the United States
Buildings and structures completed in 1966
Tourist attractions in Carroll County, Arkansas
1966 sculptures
1966 establishments in Arkansas